Tonio is a 2016 Dutch drama film directed by Paula van der Oest. It was based on the book of the same name by A.F. Th. van der Heijden. It was selected as the Dutch entry for the Best Foreign Language Film at the 89th Academy Awards but it was not nominated. The film won the Pearl Award at the Film by the Sea festival in the Netherlands in 2017.

Cast
 Chris Peters
 Pierre Bokma
 Rifka Lodeizen
 Henri Garcin
 Stefanie van Leersum

See also
 List of submissions to the 89th Academy Awards for Best Foreign Language Film
 List of Dutch submissions for the Academy Award for Best Foreign Language Film

References

External links
 

2016 films
2016 drama films
Dutch drama films
2010s Dutch-language films